Nikolsky is a rural locality (a settlement) in Ertil, Ertilsky District, Voronezh Oblast, Russia. The population was 89 as of 2010. There are 3 streets.

Geography 
Nikolsky is located 8 km southeast of Ertil (the district's administrative centre) by road. Vasilyevka is the nearest rural locality.

References 

Rural localities in Ertilsky District